Anai patti or Nagaiya Goundan patti is a village in the Theni district in the western part of the Indian state of Tamil Nadu.

References

Villages in Theni district